Douglas Kolk (1963 – August 2014) was an American artist based in Boston, Massachusetts. He is known primarily for his drawing, as well as work in collage and mixed media.

Early life and education 
Kolk was born in Newark, New Jersey in 1963. Kolk's parents operated a nursing home in Newark.

Career 
Kolk's work has been shown internationally at galleries and museums including the Helsinki City Art Museum in Finland, Kasseler Kunstverein, Museum Frieder Burda and Kunsthalle Mannheim in Germany, Kunsthalle St. Gallen, the Saatchi Gallery and Royal Academy in London. His work features in several prominent collections including The Falckenberg Collection and the Saatchi Gallery. He was represented by Arndt & Partner in Berlin and Zurich.

External links 
Douglas Kolk, edited by Oliver Zybok, Hatje Cantz, 2006. 
Oliver Zybok (Ed.): Douglas Kolk. Hatje Cantz, Ostfildern, 2006. 
Douglas Kolk at ARNDT Berlin
Douglas Kolk - Artworks - The Saatchi Gallery

References

1963 births
2014 deaths
Artists from Newark, New Jersey